Nikolai Todorov Todorov (June 6, 1921 – August 27, 2003) was a Bulgarian historian. In 1990, he briefly served as acting president of Bulgaria.

Life and career
Todorov was born in Varna and, as he noted himself, he was of Greek descent. Todorov was inspired to go into politics after the trial of Traycho Kostov, whom he had shared a prison cell with during World War II. After a distinguished academic career, which included a position at the National and Kapodistrian University of Athens, he joined the Bulgarian Ministry of Foreign Affairs. He would later serve as the Bulgarian representative to UNESCO and the Bulgarian Ambassador to Greece (1978–1983). Following Bulgaria's departure from Communism, Todorov became Speaker of the National Assembly of Bulgaria, leading him to serve as acting president.

Personal life
Todorov was married with three children. He is the father of Maria Todorova.

References

Presidents of Bulgaria
Permanent Delegates of Bulgaria to UNESCO
Members of the National Assembly (Bulgaria)
Members of the Bulgarian Academy of Sciences
Members of the Academy of Athens (modern)
Foreign Members of the USSR Academy of Sciences
Foreign Members of the Russian Academy of Sciences
Academic staff of the National and Kapodistrian University of Athens
Ambassadors of Bulgaria to Greece
Bulgarian diplomats
Sofia University alumni
Politicians from Varna, Bulgaria
1921 births
2003 deaths